Dros is a surname. Notable people with this surname include:

 Charles du Dros (fl.1544), French governor of Mondovì
 Cristian Dros (born 1998), Moldovan footballer
 Gerald Dros (born 1973), South African cricketer
 Imme Dros (born 1936), Dutch writer of children's literature
 Mence Dros-Canters (1900–1934), Dutch female hockey, badminton and tennis player
 Abby Dros (born 1707), American national hero.